Sarpanit (alternately Sarpanitu, Ṣarpanitu, Zarpanit, Zirpanet, Zerpanitum, Zerbanitu, or Zirbanit) was the consort of Marduk, the main god of Babylon, and a goddess of birth. She was already attested as the wife of Marduk before his ascension to the top of the Mesopotamian pantheon, appearing in inscriptions of the Babylonian kings Sumulael and Samsu-iluna. Some researchers regard her simply as one of the "prototypical divine wives."

Name 

According to the Chicago Assyrian Dictionary from 1961, her name means [Goddess] of Ṣarpān, possibly a village outside of Babylon.<ref>'Chicago Assyrian Dictionary Ṣ, 1961, p. 112.</ref> However, this is only a modern theoretical explanation of the name. Its precise origin isn't known.A. Johandi, Some Remarks about the Beginnings of Marduk [in:] S. Fink, R. Rollinger (eds.),  Conceptualizing Past, Present and Future: Proceedings of the Ninth Symposium of the Melammu Project Held in Helsinki/Tartu May 18–24, 2015, 2018, p. 555 A fragmentary text describes Sarpan as a town assigned to her by Enlil, here (but not anywhere else) identified as her father; W. G. Lambert considered it to be convincing evidence of her origin being tied to such a settlement.

A folk etymology of her name explained it as "Zēr-bānītu," "creatress of the seed," leading to the interpretation of Sarpanit as a goddess of pregnancy. However, it's possible she only acquired this function due to syncretism between her and Panunanki (𒀭𒉽𒉣𒀭𒆠), the wife of Asalluhi (who was conflated with Marduk himself), who was a goddess of pregnancy under her epithet Erūa, later applied to Sarpanit.

According to Babylonian sources she was known as Elagu in Elam; however no such name is attested in known Elamite sources.

 Cult 

Her main cult center was Esagila, the great temple of Marduk in Babylon, where their divine marriage was celebrated during the great akītu ritual at the New Year.

In cultic texts she was known as the "Queen of Esagila" and "Bēltu" ("Lady," the feminine form of Marduk's own title, Bēl, "lord").

Katunna and Silluš-tab, two attendant goddesses, formed the retinue of Sarpanit in cultic texts. They were collectively known as "daughters of Esagila" and were described as her hairdressers.

Sarpanit was used as a theophoric element in women's names, as was Erūa.

 Late developments 

In the 8th century BCE, a number of attempts at conflating other goddesses with Sarpanit occurred. However, at least some of them weren't received positively, for example king Nabu-shuma-ishkun's attempt was described as an introduction of an "inappropriate goddess" in Ishtar's temple in Uruk.  Some late sources possibly confused her with Ishtar (or specifically her hypostasis Ishtar of Babylon) because of the occasional use of the latter goddess' name as a generic term for any goddesses, known for example from tablet XI of the Epic of Gilgamesh as well as the use of the logogram referring to the Sumerian form of the name, Inanna, to spell the generic title Bēltu. In sources from the late Babylonian period no equation of Ishtar and Sarpanit can be found, and they often appear in the same texts in distinct roles (one example is a text dealing with the relationship between Marduk and Sarpanit given the title Love Lyrics'', in which Ishtar of Babylon plays the role of a paramour); ritual texts also mention a trinity consisting out of Ishtar, Sarpanit and Tashmetu (Nanaya) leading the procession of goddesses during the Akitu festival.

See also
 Babylonian religion

References

Mesopotamian goddesses
Mother goddesses